The Big Creek Ranger Station Historic District, located near Polebridge in Flathead National Forest in Flathead County, Montana, is a historic district which was listed on the National Register of Historic Places in 2015.

A news release stated the district was recognized "for its historical associations with the creation and administration of Flathead National Forest programs, and fire management in USFS Region One and the western United States. The property has added significance for the qualities of the buildings which reflect Craftsman influences combined with a rustic aesthetic, a typical format for USDA Forest Service buildings in the west and particularly Region One."

References

Historic districts on the National Register of Historic Places in Montana
National Register of Historic Places in Flathead County, Montana
United States Forest Service ranger stations
Flathead National Forest